The Madras High Court is a High Court in India. It has appellate jurisdiction over the state of Tamil Nadu and the union territory of Puducherry. It is located in Chennai, and is the third oldest high court of India after the Calcutta High Court in Kolkata and Bombay High Court in Mumbai. The Madras High Court is one of four charter high courts of colonial India established in the four Presidency Towns of Madras, Bombay, Allahabad and Calcutta by letters patent granted by Queen Victoria, dated 26 June 1862. It exercises original jurisdiction over the city of Chennai, as well as extraordinary original jurisdiction, civil and criminal, under the letters patent and special original jurisdiction for the issue of writs under the Constitution of India. Covering 107 acres, the court complex is one of the largest in the world, second only to the Supreme Court of the United Kingdom.

The High Court consists of 74 judges and a chief justice.

History
From 1817 to 1862, the Supreme Court of Madras was opposite the Chennai Beach railway station. From 1862 to 1892, the High Court was also housed there. The present buildings were officially inaugurated on 12 July 1892, when the then Madras Governor, Beilby, Baron Wenlock, handed over the key to then Chief Justice Sir Arthur Collins.

British India's three presidency towns of Madras (Chennai), Bombay (Mumbai), and Calcutta (Kolkata) were each granted a High Court by letters patent dated 26 June 1862. The letters patent were issued by Queen Victoria under the authority of the British parliament's Indian High Courts Act 1861. The three courts are unique, established under British royal charter in contrast with the other high courts, which were established under the Indian Constitution. The Constitution of India recognises the older courts.

The Madras High Court was formed by merging the Supreme Court of Judicature at Madras, and the Sadr Diwani Adalat. The Court was required to decide cases in accordance with justice, equity and good conscience. The earliest judges included Holloway, Innes, and Morgan. The first Indian to sit on the High Court was Justice T. Muthuswamy Iyer. Other early Indian judges included Justices V. Krishnaswamy Iyer and P. R. Sundaram Iyer.

The Madras High Court was a pioneer in Original Side jurisdiction reform in favor of Indian practitioners as early as the 1870s.

The history means that the decisions of the British Judicial Committee of the Privy Council are still binding on it, provided that the ratio of a case has not been overruled by the Supreme Court of India.

Although the city was renamed from Madras to Chennai in 1996, the Court continued as the Madras High Court. The Tamil Nadu Legislative Assembly passed a unanimous resolution appealing to the Central Government to rename the court as High Court of Tamil Nadu since the Court serves the whole state.

Court complex

The High Court complex is located in the southern end of George Town. The building was constructed after relocating temples on the land. The building now used exclusively by the High Court was built to also house the Courts of Small Causes and the City Civil Court. These were subsequently shifted to other buildings on the campus.

The High Court building is an example of Indo-Saracenic architecture. Construction began in October 1888 and was completed in 1892 following the design prepared by J. W. Brassington, and later under the guidance of architect Henry Irwin, who completed it with the assistance of J. H. Stephens.

Brassington initially prepared a plan to construct a building with 11 court halls at an estimate of 945,000. Six were meant for the High Court, four for the Small Causes Court, and one for the City Civil Court. An additional building to house lawyers’ chambers was added to the plan, with a first floor walkway to connect it to the main building, increasing the budget to 1,298,163. Complementing a 125-feet-tall standalone lighthouse that was already on the site, a dioptric light was built on the 142-feet-high main tower of the building, raising the tower's height to 175 feet.

Save for the steel girders and some ornamental tiles, almost all the material for the construction was procured locally. Brick and terracotta were brought from government brickyards. Most of the construction was executed by local artisans trained at the School of Arts.

The High Court building was damaged in the shelling of Madras by SMS Emden on 22 September 1914, at the beginning of the First World War. It remains one of the few Indian buildings to have been damaged by a German attack.

The building offers several points of architectural interest. The painted ceilings and the stained glass doors are masterpieces. The old lighthouse is housed within the High Court campus but is poorly maintained and in disrepair.

The boundaries of the complex are marked by Prakasam Road (formerly Broadway) and Rajaji Road (the old North Beach Road), stretching northward from the statue of Rajaji in the northeast and the statue of T. Prakasamgaru in the southwest within the complex. The complex houses the largest number of courts in Asia.

The city civil and sessions courts, which are located inside the High Court campus, are in two blocks, namely, the main and annexe buildings. Some of the city civil courts are located at Additional City Civil Court Complex at Allikulam Commercial Complex in Park Town and M. Singaravelar Maligai in George Town. The District and Session Court for Exclusive Trial of Bomb Blast Cases is located at Karayanchavadi in the neighbourhood of Poonamallee, and the Commercial Court is located in the neighbourhood of Egmore.

Bench
The Acting Chief Justice of the Madras High Court is Munishwar Nath Bhandari. The court houses 57 judges, including the Chief Justice. They exercise civil, criminal, writ, testamentary and admiralty jurisdiction. The Madurai Bench began functioning in 2004.

The vestiges of the colonial High Court characterise the premises. Justices of the Madras High Court are led by orderlies who bear a ceremonial mace made of silver. Most High Courts and the Supreme Court of India either never had the practice or abandoned it.

Related publications

Madras Law Journal 
The Madras High Court is the birthplace of organised legal reporting in India. It is home to the Madras Law Journal, which was the first journal dedicated to reporting texts of judgments of the High Court. It started in 1891.

The Saturday Club met every week. It was started at the house of the Vakil Bar's senior member Sir S. Subramania Iyer in Mylapore in 1888. All leading members of the Madras Bar took part. At one meeting, it was decided to start The Madras Law Journal, which was inspired by other newly established periodicals such as Law Quarterly Review, started by Sir Frederick Pollock in England in 1885 and The Harvard Law Review established by Harvard Law School Association in 1887.

The objectives of the journal were laid out in the preface of the first issue:

The Madras Law Journal is known for its quickness and reporting accuracy and its discriminating selection of cases to be reported. It occupies a premier place among Indian legal periodicals.

Madras Weekly Notes (criminal and civil) 
Madras Weekly Notes is a law journal reporting criminal judgements of the Madras High Court from 1910 to till date.

Citations are formatted as, e.g., "1929 1 MWN(Cr.) 1", where (left to right) 1929 is the year, 1 is the volume, "MWN(Cr.)" is the abbreviated journal name, and "1" is the page number.

Journals 
Journals that record cases include Current Tamil Nadu Cases, Current Writ Cases, and Tamil Nadu Motor Accident Cases.

Madurai Bench
Established in 2004, the Madurai bench of the Madras High Court handles cases in the fourteen southern districts of Tamil Nadu, as the court is located in the far-northern capital. The bench is located in Madurai, and has the Kanyakumari, Tirunelveli, Thoothukudi, Tenkasi, Madurai, Dindigul, Ramanathapuram, Virudhunagar, Theni, Sivaganga, Pudukottai, Thanjavur, Tiruchirappalli and Karur districts under its jurisdiction.

Its 107-acre campus is one of the largest in the country, It is second largest in the world after the Supreme Court of the United Kingdom. The four-storey administrative building attracts hundreds of litigants every day. The court complex has 12 court halls, furnished on the model of the court halls in the Supreme Court, the Delhi and the Madras High Court.

The court, since its inauguration on 24 July 2004, has accelerated the legal process in the southern districts.

List of Chief Justices

Supreme Court

High Court (British Administration)

High Court (Indian Administration)

Judges
The Madras High Court is permitted to have a maximum of 75 judges, of which 56 may be permanently appointed and 19 may be additionally appointed. It currently has 54 judges.

Permanent judges

Additional judges

See also

 High Courts of India
 Architecture of Chennai
 Heritage structures in Chennai

References

External links

 

 
1862 establishments in India
Buildings and structures in Chennai
Courts and tribunals established in 1862
Heritage sites in Chennai
Judiciary of India
Madras